John W. McClain House is a historic home located in Washington Township, Hendricks County, Indiana.  It was built about 1876, and is a -story, Italianate style brick dwelling.  It has a hipped roof that was formerly topped by a widow's walk.  A one-story addition was built about 1880, and a one-story wraparound porch was added in the early-20th century.

It was added to the National Register of Historic Places in 2004.

References

Houses on the National Register of Historic Places in Indiana
Italianate architecture in Indiana
Houses completed in 1876
National Register of Historic Places in Hendricks County, Indiana
Buildings and structures in Hendricks County, Indiana